Agus Amàrach, an EP, is the first CD released by Mistle Thrush, a goth-identified band based in Boston, Massachusetts. It came out in 1994 on Washington, D.C.-based Bedazzled Records (catalog #BDZ19). It was followed by the band's debut full-length, Silt, in 1995. "Agus amàrach" is Celtic, and translates as "and tomorrow".

Track listing
All songs written by Mistle Thrush
"Champion Jack" – 4:52
"Beside" – 4:31
"Escapades in Glass" – 4:29
"Stars Like Dust" – 3:40
"Six Hour Sunday" – 5:06
Note: there is 20 seconds of silence at the end of "Six Hour Sunday", followed by twenty-one tracks of silence (each ranging in length from 14 to 25 seconds), and then an untitled 2:10 ambient wash of sound (heavily effected guitars and piano) spread across five tracks (each ranging in length from 20 to 31 seconds).

Personnel

The band
Todd Demma — Percussion
Valerie Forgione — vocals, acoustic guitar ("Stars Like Dust")
Ruben Layman — Bass guitar
Scott Patalano — Scopic, Spookadelic and eustasis guitars
Brad Rigney — Guitars

Production
Y. Mike — Producer

Additional credits
Recorded at The Studio
Petrina Katsikas — Manager
Rebecca Fagan — Design, photography
Frank Fagan — Photography
Mark MacElhiney — Photography
"Mistle Thrush would like to thank: our families; Petrina; Y. Mike; Rebecca; Matt Kattman; Andrew Reynhout; Steve & Rob; Ann-Marie; Merry; Mike & Juliette; Justin & Todd & Beanie; John DeGregario; Mike Anderson; Christian; Dave Sheehan; Laurabelfry; Rob Finn; Mark MacElhiney; Annette; Rob; Sean; Joel Simches; T-Max; all the kind radio people, especially Juanita, Albert O, Phillip G, and Mikey Dee; Y. Mom & Marty; Chris Porter; Mike Stuto; and all who have believed in us along the way."

Sources
CD liner notes

Mistle Thrush (band) albums
1994 EPs